Ventė Cape, sometimes referred to as Ventė Horn or Ventė Peninsula, is a headland in the Nemunas Delta, in Šilutė district, Lithuania. It is known as a resting place for birds during their migration, particularly in autumn. Ventė Cape Ornithological Station – one of the first bird ringing stations in Europe still in operation – was opened here by Tadas Ivanauskas in 1929.

The Cape, being in the former Memel Territory, was part of Germany until 1919. The Teutonic Knights erected a castle here, called Windenburg, but it no longer exists. There is an 11-metre-high lighthouse, built in 1863 during the Prussian period, though it is not currently in use.

External links

Headlands of Lithuania
Birdwatching sites